In enzymology, an anthocyanidin reductase is an enzyme that catalyzes the chemical reaction

a flavan-3-ol + 2 NAD(P)+  an anthocyanidin + 2 NAD(P)H + H+

The 3 substrates of this enzyme are flavan-3-ol, NAD+, and NADP+, whereas its 4 products are anthocyanidin, NADH, NADPH, and H+.

This enzyme belongs to the family of oxidoreductases, specifically those acting on the CH-CH group of donor with NAD+ or NADP+ as acceptor.  The systematic name of this enzyme class is flavan-3-ol:NAD(P)+ oxidoreductase. Other names in common use include AtANR, and MtANR.  This enzyme participates in flavonoid biosynthesis.

References 

 
 

EC 1.3.1
NADPH-dependent enzymes
NADH-dependent enzymes
Enzymes of unknown structure
Flavanols metabolism
Anthocyanins metabolism